Abū ʿAmr Muḥammad ibn ʿUmar ibn ʿAbd al-ʿAzīz al-Kashshī, died 941 or 951 or 978, known as al-Kashshi or (in Persian) as Kashshi, was a Twelver Shi'ite scholar specializing in biographical evaluation and hadith studies.

Life
Al-Kashshi's exact date of birth is unclear. Al-Kashshi and al-Kulayni shared a number of teachers such as Muhammad ibn Ismail al-Naysaburi, as well as some students such as Ibn Qulawayh. This would place al-Kashshi roughly in the same time period as al-Kulayni, i.e., somewhere between the middle of the 9th century and the middle of the 10th century.

He was born in city of Kesh or Kish (known today as Shahrisabz) in Transoxiana (today: Uzbekistan).

Writings
Al-Kashshi's works are all lost today. This work deals with the biographical evaluation of hadith transmitters, the goal of which was to establish whether individual transmitters are to be regarded as trustworthy, and whether their narrations –one of the main sources of Islamic doctrine– should be accepted or rejected.

The  ranks as one of the four most important works in the Shi'ite biographical literature.

References

Further reading

850s births
10th-century deaths
Year of birth uncertain
Year of death uncertain
People from Shahrisabz
9th-century people
10th-century people
Shia hadith scholars